A Pin for the Butterfly is a 1994 British-Czech drama film directed by Hannah Kodicek and starring Ian Bannen, Hugh Laurie and Florence Hoath. The screenplay concerns a young girl who tries to come terms with growing up in Stalinist Czechoslovakia. It was screened at the 1994 Cannes Film Festival.

Cast
 Ian Bannen ...  Grandpa 
 Gregory Gudgeon ...  Leon 
 Florence Hoath ...  Marushka 
 Ian Hogg ...  Great Uncle 
 Alex Kingston 
 Hugh Laurie ...  Uncle 
 Joan Plowright ...  Grandma 
 Imogen Stubbs ...  Mother

References

External links

1994 films
1994 drama films
British drama films
Czech drama films
Films about communism
Films set in the 1950s
Films set in Prague
1990s English-language films
1990s British films